Basch is a surname. Notable people with the surname include:

 Árpád Basch (1873–1944), Hungarian Jewish painter, graphic artist
 Franz Anton Basch aka Ferenc Antal Basch (1901–1946), German Nazi leader in Hungary, executed for war crimes
 Gyula Basch (1859–1928), Hungarian Jewish painter
 Harry Basch (born 1926), American actor
 Peter Basch (1921–2004), Austrian-American photographer
 Raphael Basch (1813-), Bohemian-Austrian Jewish writer and politician
 Samuel Siegfried Karl von Basch (1837–1905), Jewish Bohemian-Austrian physician
 Victor Basch (1863/5-1944), Jewish Hungarian-French politician
Andor Basch (1885–1944), Hungarian painter

Fictional:
 Basch fon Ronsenburg, a character in Final Fantasy XII (see List of Final Fantasy XII characters)

See also 
 Batsch (disambiguation)
 Pasch (surname)